The Central District of Sarbaz County is a district (bakhsh) in Sarbaz County, Sistan and Baluchestan province, Iran. At the 2006 census, including the portions later split off to form Parud District and excluding portions later joined from Pishin District, its population was 40,740, in 7,740 families; after those transfers, its population was 22,298, in 4,384 families.  The district has one city: Rasak. The district has two rural districts (dehestan): Jakigur Rural District and Rask and Firuzabad Rural District.

References 

Sarbaz County
Districts of Sistan and Baluchestan Province